The White River Formation is a geologic formation of the Paleogene Period, in the northern Great Plains and central Rocky Mountains, within the United States.

It has been found in northeastern Colorado, Dawes County in western Nebraska, Badlands of western South Dakota, and Douglas area of southeastern Wyoming.

Fossil record 

The geologic formation preserves fossils dating back to the Eocene and Oligocene Epochs of the Paleogene Period, during the Cenozoic Era.  It contains the most complete Late Eocene−Priabonian and Early Oligocene−Rupelian vertebrate record in North America.

See also 
 
 Chadronian — Priabonian, Rupelian
 Orellan — Rupelian

References 

 
Geologic formations of the United States
Paleogene United States
Eocene paleontological sites of North America
Oligocene paleontological sites of North America
Paleogene Colorado
Paleogene geology of Nebraska
Paleogene geology of South Dakota
Paleogene geology of Wyoming
Eocene United States
Chadronian
Orellan
Whitneyan
Geology of the Rocky Mountains
Great Plains
Paleontology in South Dakota
Paleontology in Wyoming